Lewis Preston (born October 31, 1970) is an American college basketball coach.  He served as the head men's basketball coach at Kennesaw State University in Kennesaw, Georgia from 2011 to 2014. Preston served previously as an assistant coach at Pennsylvania State University, Coastal Carolina University, the University of Notre Dame, and under Billy Donovan at the University of Florida.

Head coaching record

*Preston took a leave of absence mid-season. Assistant coach Jimmy Lallathin took over the remainder of the year.

References

External links
 Penn State profile

1970 births
Living people
American men's basketball coaches
Basketball players from Virginia
Coastal Carolina Chanticleers men's basketball coaches
College men's basketball head coaches in the United States
Florida Gators men's basketball coaches
Kennesaw State Owls men's basketball coaches
Notre Dame Fighting Irish men's basketball coaches
Penn State Nittany Lions basketball coaches
People from Franklin County, Virginia
VMI Keydets basketball players
American men's basketball players
Basketball coaches from Virginia